Cecil J. Allen (1886 – 5 February 1973) was a British railway engineer and technical journalist and writer.

Work
Allen qualified as a civil engineer and joined the Great Eastern Railway in 1903, later working for the London & North Eastern Railway retiring in 1946. He inspected new rails for quality.

Allen also was the second contributor to the long-running British locomotive practice and performance article series in The Railway Magazine from 1909 to 1958, He was concurrently editor of Trains Illustrated in the 1940s, and was succeeded in that position by his son, Geoffrey Freeman Allen, in 1950.

Allen was a committed Christian and an accomplished organist, writing a chorus "The Lord has need of me". He was offered a place on the train when Mallard broke the world speed record in 1938, but declined the offer as the run was scheduled for a Sunday morning and clashed with his regular church (Christian Brethren) attendance. He died on 5 February 1973.

Bibliography
He wrote numerous books on locomotives, and railway company histories, as well as an autobiography "Two Million Miles of Train Travel":
Locomotives

Railway company histories

General railways

Other

See also
Geoffrey Freeman Allen, his son, also a writer on railway topics, and first editor of Modern Railways

References

British railway mechanical engineers
Great Eastern Railway people
London and North Eastern Railway people
Rail transport writers
1886 births
1973 deaths